Miss Earth México is an annual beauty pageant in Mexico. The winner of Miss Earth Mexico obtains the right to represent the country in the Miss Earth pageant, the third most important beauty festival in the world, where the goal is to promote environmental protection.

History

Miss Earth México, based in Mérida, Yucatán, is organized by the national director Paul Marsell. The pageant was established in order to elect Mexico's representative in the annual Miss Earth pageant and to promote environmental awareness and protection.

Miss Earth Mexico was founded in 2002, but the first national contest was not held until 2007. Titleholders prior to 2007 were chosen by the organizers in a private selection process.

Mexico was first represented in Miss Earth 2002 by Libna Viruega Roldán from Distrito Federal, who was the first titleholder of Miss Earth Mexico.

In 2008, Abigail Elizalde Romo, Miss Earth Mexico 2008, advanced in the semifinal and final round for the first time for Mexico at the Miss Earth pageant and eventually won the Miss Water (2nd Runner-up), one of the elemental crowns, in the Miss Earth 2008.

Titleholders
Below are the names of the annual titleholders of Miss Earth Mexico, listed in ascending order and according to the year in which they participated in Miss Earth. The states they represented during their national crowning or designation and their final placements and special awards acquired in the aforementioned global beauty competition are also displayed.

Color Key

Minor International beauty pageant

Miss Supranational

Miss Intercontinental

Candidates
Perla Beltrán won second place (Miss Earth México Air 2007) in Miss Earth México 2007. Later, she competed in Nuestra Belleza Sinaloa where she won second place; she was later designated to compete in Nuestra Belleza Mexico 2008 where she won Nuestra Belleza Mexico Mundo and the right to represent Mexico in Miss World 2009, where she won the second place (Miss World first runner up) in the pageant and the title of Miss World Americas and Miss World Top Model.

See also
Señorita México
Nuestra Belleza México

References

External links
Miss Earth Mexico official website

 
Beauty pageants in Mexico
Mexican awards
Mexican culture
Mexico
2002 establishments in Mexico